The 2015 San Diego Toreros football team represented the University of San Diego during the 2015 NCAA Division I FCS football season. They were led by third-year head coach Dale Lindsey and played their home games at Torero Stadium. They were a member of the Pioneer Football League. They finished the season 9–2, 7–1 in PFL play to share the league championship with Dayton. Due to their head to head loss to Dayton, they did not receive the PFL's automatic bid to the FCS Playoffs and did not receive an at-large bid.

Schedule

Game summaries

at San Diego State

Western New Mexico

at Valparaiso

Marist

at Dayton

Drake

Warner

at Stetson

Campbell

at Davidson

Butler

References

San Diego
San Diego Toreros football seasons
Pioneer Football League champion seasons
San Diego Toreros football